Fairbanks is a city in Alaska. It may also refer to:

Places in the United States
Fairbanks North Star Borough, Alaska
Fairbanks Ranch, California
Fairbanks, Florida
Fairbanks, Indiana
Fairbanks, a village in Farmington, Maine
Fairbanks, Minnesota
Fairbanks, Oregon
Fairbanks, Houston, Texas
Fairbanks, Wisconsin
Fairbanks, Louisiana

Other uses
Fairbanks (surname)
Fairbanks disease, a genetic disorder affecting bone growth, also known as multiple epiphyseal dysplasia
Fairbanks House (Dedham, Massachusetts) (built in 1637), the oldest wood-frame house in the U.S.
Fairbanks station (disambiguation), several stations with the name

See also

Fairbank (disambiguation)